Grizedale Arts is a contemporary arts residency and commissioning agency sited in Grizedale Forest in the central Lake District in rural Northern England. It conducts cultural projects locally, nationally and internationally from its bases at Lawson Park farm and the Coniston Institute. Its focus is on developing emerging artists and producing experimental yet accessible projects that demonstrate the purpose and function of art as an everyday aspect of a worthwhile and productive life. The organisation is financially supported by Arts Council England. Adam Sutherland, the director, guest-curated 'The Land We Live In, The Land We Left Behind' for Hauser & Wirth Somerset in 2018, a major historic and contemporary survey of rural cultures that attracted over 40,000 visitors to the galleries in Bruton.

History
The predecessor of Grizedale Arts, the Grizedale Society, was founded by Bill Grant OBE in 1968 to further the arts within the Grizedale forest. Bill worked as Head Forrester for the Forestry Commission at the time. It initially concentrated on theatre and the visual arts. Bill created the Theatre in the Forest, a unique 230-seater venue, which attracted top entertainers such as Sir Anthony Hopkins, Dame Judi Dench, Julian Lloyd Webber and jazz player Kenny Ball. 

In 1977, Bill also established the Grizedale Sculpture Trail, which became world renowned for its siting of environmental sculptures by young upcoming sculptors. Artists were given a 6 month residency in the forest to create sculptures in keeping and inspired by the location. Notable sculptors include David Nash, Robert Koenig and Andy Goldsworthy. These sculptures are now maintained by the Forestry Commission and are accessible to the public. In 1990, the Society was awarded the Prudential Award for the Arts. "In tribute for a leap of imagination that has enriched our perception and understanding of art in the landscape.”   

Bill retired in 1997. Diana Walters and David Fenn followed as directors until Adam Sutherland was appointed in 1999. Not long after for financial reasons, the board closed The Theatre in the Forest and The Gallery in the Forest, deciding to concentrate on exploring new approaches to artistic production and exhibition. The residency programme was also ended and no longer did artists use natural found materials to create sculptures inspired by the location, instead man made materials such as plastic and metal were brought in. The artworks produced at this time were not popular with  visitors who sent complaint letters and even damaged Sutherland's car. The local residents of Satterthwaite after being offered the chance to create their own artwork for a Billboard sculpture in the forest decided unanimously to burn it down instead. In 1999 Sutherland formed Grizedale Arts, merging with the Grizedale Society to form a new organisation.

In 2007, the organisation moved its base from Grizedale Forest to the historic hill farm of Lawson Park, overlooking Coniston Water. Once owned by John Ruskin and a working farm until the 1950s, architects Sutherland Hussey were employed to transform the farmhouse and barns into an artists' residency base, opened in 2009 by Sir Nicholas Serota of Tate. The surrounding land is being returned to productive use, and the extensive gardens – designed by artist / film-maker Karen Guthrie – have opened under the National Garden Scheme.

Projects
Grizedale Arts' projects have included:
 A Fair Land (2016)
 The Coniston Institute Honest Shop (2013)
 Wantee (for the Turner Prize) by Laure Prouvost (2013)
 Gralsbaby D'Annunzioz (2009)
 Happy Stacking (2008)
 Agrifashionista (2008)
 Creative Egremont – A Public Art Strategy for Egremont.  (2006–2008)
 Seven Samurai (2006) within the Japanese Echigo Tsumari Art Triennial. Also shown at the Gallery Lucy Mackintosh (2007) 
 Romantic Detachment (2004) at the P.S. 1 Contemporary Art Center in New York
 The Festival of Lying (2000)

Artists
Artists who have been involved with the Grizedale Arts programme include:

Anna Best, Jordan Baseman, David Blandy, Kathrin Böhm, Simon Poulter, Marcus Coates, Karen Guthrie & Nina Pope, Olivia Plender, Lorrice Douglas, Juneau/projects, Kerry Stewart, Daniel Sturgis, Emily Wardill, Graeme Roger, Rob Kesseler, Ken Russell, Kevin Reid, Jen Lui, Tim Olden, Simon & Tom Bloor, Matt Stokes, Nathaniel Mellors, Bedwyr Williams, public works, myvillages.org, Mark Wallinger, Jeremy Deller, Tim Olden, Olaf Breuning, Mark Gubb, Pablo Bronstein, Bryan & Laura Davies, Phil Collins, Spartacus Chetwynd, Harold Offeh, Jay Yung, Dorian Moore, Alex Frost, Guest Room & Barnaby Hosking.

Notable successes among Grizedale alumni include Jeremy Deller and Mark Wallinger winning the Turner Prize in 2004 and 2007 respectively; Marcus Coates, Olivia Plender, Ryan Gander, Graham Gussin, Giorgio Sadotti and Jeremy Deller receiving Paul Hamlyn Awards; Bedwyr Williams was the Welsh artist in residence at the 2005 Venice Biennale; Mark Wallinger representing Great Britain in the 2001 Venice Biennale; Paul Rooney (artist) winning 2009's Northern Art Prize; Karen Guthrie and Nina Pope winning the Northern Art Prize in 2008.

References

External links
 Grizedale Arts Official site
 Lawson Park, Grizedale Arts' hill farm
 We Are Seven: Artist Commune Project
 Toadball.TV: Television Project

Artist links
 Jordan Baseman
 Somewhere – Karen Guthrie & Nina Pope
 Olaf Breuning
 Public Works
 myvillages.org
 Urbania Collective
 Dorian Moore
 GuestRoom
 Maria Benjamin

Arts councils of the United Kingdom
Organisations based in Cumbria
English contemporary art
Arts organisations based in England
Culture in Cumbria
1968 establishments in England